Gerhard Paul (born 1951, Biedenkopf) is a German historian and retired (2016) professor of the University of Flensburg.

Awards and recognition
2005: International book award for the year of 2004 in the category "Neueste Geschichte" ("Recent History") from H-Soz-u-Kult for  Bilder des Krieges − Krieg der Bilder. Die Visualisierung des modernen Krieges. (Images of War - War of Images. The visualization of modern war.)
2009: First place in the September 2009 list of recommended books of the humanities, cultural and social sciences (by Süddeutsche Zeitung and Norddeutscher Rundfunk) for the atlas he edited:  Das Jahrhundert der Bilder. Band 1: Bildatlas 1900 bis 1949, Band 2: Bildatlas 1949 bis heute. Vandenhoeck & Ruprecht

Books
 Aufstand der Bilder. Die NS–Propaganda vor 1933. Bonn 1990. 
 (with Erich Koch) Staatlicher Terror und gesellschaftliche Verrohung. Die Gestapo in Schleswig-Holstein. Ergebnisse-Verlag, Hamburg 1996, .
„Landunter!“ Schleswig-Holstein und das Hakenkreuz. Aufsätze. Westfälisches Dampfboot, Münster 2001, .
 (with Bettina Goldberg) Matrosenanzug, Davidstern. Bilder jüdischen Lebens aus der Provinz, Neumünster, Wachholtz, 2002, 
 Bilder des Krieges – Krieg der Bilder. Die Visualisierung des modernen Krieges. Schöningh, Paderborn 2004; . Fink, München; .
Der Bilderkrieg. Inszenierungen, Bilder und Perspektiven der „Operation Irakische Freiheit“, Wallstein, Göttingen 2005, .
In addition to monographs, he was also an editor of a number of books in history.

References

External links
Gerhard Paul website
Works of Gerhard Paul in German National Library catalog
 Gerhard Paul profile at  journal

1951 births
Living people
20th-century German historians
Academic staff of the University of Flensburg
21st-century German historians